Mexicali F.C. is a Mexican professional football team based in Mexicali, Baja California that will play in the Liga Premier de México starting in the 2022–23 season.

History
The team was announced in October 2021, although the name or identity it would hold was unknown. In the first half of 2022, more details about the club began to be known, including the name, nickname, colors and the stadium they would use.

On July 1, 2022, the team's participation in the Liga Premier -Serie A was confirmed. Mexicali F.C. is the first team in the city to participate in the Mexican Second Division.

Players

First-team squad

Managers 
  Agustín Hernández (2022)
  Enrique López Zarza (2022–)

References

Mexicali
Football clubs in Baja California
Association football clubs established in 2021
2021 establishments in Mexico